Jonah Williams (born November 17, 1997) is an American football offensive tackle for the Cincinnati Bengals of the National Football League (NFL). He played college football at Alabama.

High School career
Williams moved to California in ninth grade, after growing up in Atlanta.  In Folsom, Williams was a four-star offensive tackle who committed to Alabama.  He also received offers from Auburn, Arkansas, Florida, Georgia, Michigan and USC.

College career
During his first season, Williams received the reputation as a "film junkie".  Following the 2017 season, Williams was named to the Third-team All-American.  On January 11, 2019, Williams announced that he would declare for the 2019 NFL Draft.

Professional career

Williams was drafted by the Cincinnati Bengals 11th overall in the first round of the 2019 NFL Draft.

On June 25, 2019, it was revealed that Williams underwent left shoulder surgery to repair a torn labrum. Williams had suffered the injury while participating in OTAs two weeks prior to the surgery. He was placed on the reserve/physically unable to perform list on August 31, 2019. He did not play during his rookie season.

Williams entered the 2020 season as the Bengals starting left tackle. He started 10 of 12 games, missing two games due to injury, before suffering a knee injury in Week 14. He was placed on injured reserve on December 9, 2020.

The Bengals picked up the fifth-year option on Williams' contract on April 29, 2022.

Following the Bengals signing left tackle Orlando Brown Jr., Williams requested a trade in March 2023.

References

External links
Alabama Crimson Tide bio

1997 births
Living people
American football offensive tackles
Alabama Crimson Tide football players
People from Folsom, California
Players of American football from California
Sportspeople from Sacramento County, California
All-American college football players
Cincinnati Bengals players